Zamir Khan (born 16 March 1992) is an Afghan cricketer.  Khan is a left-handed batsman who bowls slow left-arm orthodox.

Khan was a member of Afghanistan's squad for the 2011 ACC Twenty20 Cup in Nepal.  It was during this tournament that he made his debut for Afghanistan against Oman.  He made five further appearances during the tournament, including in the final against Hong Kong, which Afghanistan won.  He was later selected as part of Afghanistan's squad for the 2012 World Twenty20 Qualifier in Dubai.  His debut in Twenty20 debut came during this tournament, against Denmark.  He claimed his maiden wicket in that format during this match, that of Aftab Ahmed to finish with figures of 1/6 from three overs.  He made a second appearance during the tournament, against Nepal, but went wicketless in the match.

He made his List A debut for Afghanistan A against Zimbabwe A during their tour to Zimbabwe on 29 January 2017. He made his first-class debut for Speen Ghar Region in the 2017–18 Ahmad Shah Abdali 4-day Tournament on 1 November 2017.

In September 2018, he was named in Kabul's squad in the first edition of the Afghanistan Premier League tournament.

References and notes

External links
Zamir Khan at ESPNcricinfo
Zamir Khan at CricketArchive

1992 births
Living people
Afghan cricketers
Afghanistan Twenty20 International cricketers
Spin Ghar Tigers cricketers
Kabul Zwanan cricketers